Michael John Hartmann GBS is a senior judge. He is Chairman of the Market Misconduct Tribunal and the Securities and Futures Appeals Tribunal in Hong Kong.

Early life and education

Hartmann was born in Bombay (now Mumbai), British India on 24 July 1944 to a British father and an Australian mother. He was raised near Orange, New South Wales, Australia. 
He holds Australian citizenship.

Hartmann moved to England at the age of nine. After obtaining his A Levels in England, he moved to Rhodesia (now Zimbabwe). He received an LLB from the University of London through the University College of Rhodesia in 1967. After university, he completed national service in the Rhodesian Army.

Legal career

Hartmann was admitted as an attorney in Rhodesia in 1971 and practised in Harare. In 1983, he left Zimbabwe and moved to Hong Kong to join the Legal Department as Crown Counsel. He was promoted to Senior Crown Counsel in 1984 and became a Deputy Principal Crown Counsel in 1989.

Judicial career

Hartmann left the Legal Department and was appointed a District Judge in 1991.

In 1998, Hartmann was appointed as a Judge of the Court of First Instance of the High Court of Hong Kong.

From 1998 to 2000, Hartmann served as Chairman of the Insider Dealing Tribunal.

From 2000 to 2008, Hartmann was Judge in charge of the Constitutional and Administrative Law List in the Court of First Instance of the High Court of Hong Kong.

In 2008, Hartmann was appointed as a Justice of Appeal of the Court of Appeal.

In 2010, Hartmann was appointed as a Non-Permanent Judge of the Court of Final Appeal. From 2010 to 2012, Hartmann primarily sat in the Court of Appeal and heard two cases in the Court of Final Appeal.

In 2011, Hartmann was appointed as Chairman of the Market Misconduct Tribunal and the Securities and Futures Appeals Tribunal for a 3-year term from December 2011 to November 2014.

In 2012, Hartmann retired from the Court of Appeal. He was awarded the Gold Bauhinia Star by the Chief Executive. He continued to serve as a Non-Permanent Judge of the Court of Final Appeal until 2016.

In 2013, Hartmann sat as a Deputy High Court Judge.

In 2014, Hartmann was re-appointed as Chairman of the Market Misconduct Tribunal and the Securities and Futures Appeals Tribunal for another 3-year term until November 2017. In 2017, his appointment was extended for a further 3-year term until November 2020.

In 2018, Hartmann was appointed as Chairman and Commissioner of the Commission of Inquiry into the Diaphragm Wall and Platform Slab Construction Works at the Hung Hom Station Extension under the Shatin to Central Link Project.

In 2020, Hartmann's appointment as Chairman of the Market Misconduct Tribunal and the Securities and Futures Appeals Tribunal was extended again for another 3-year term until November 2023.

References

1944 births
Australian people of Anglo-Indian descent
Australian judges on the courts of Hong Kong
British Hong Kong judges
Zimbabwean emigrants to Hong Kong
Hong Kong people of Zimbabwean descent
Hong Kong people of Australian descent
Indian emigrants to Rhodesia
Living people
Rhodesian lawyers
White Rhodesian people
Justices of the Court of Final Appeal (Hong Kong)
Recipients of the Gold Bauhinia Star